Mankumpi Constituency is an electoral constituency in the Kavango West Region of Namibia. The administrative centre is the village of Satotwa. Mankumpi was created in August 2013, following a recommendation of the Fourth Delimitation Commission of Namibia, and in preparation of the 2014 general election. It was formed from the south-eastern part of the former Kahenge Constituency.

Politics
As in all Kavango West constituencies, SWAPO won the 2015 regional election by a landslide. Lukas Muha received 1,335 votes, followed by Frans Kandjembo Muremi of the All People's Party (APP, 66 votes). For the 2020 regional election no opposition candidate was fielded, and the sitting SWAPO councillor was duly re-elected. Muha was subsequently elected to be one of the three councillors representing Kavango West in the National Council of Namibia, and the National Council elected him as its fifth chairperson.

See also
 Administrative divisions of Namibia

References

Constituencies of Kavango West Region
States and territories established in 2013
2013 establishments in Namibia